The Bataan–Cavite Interlink Bridge, also known as the Manila Bay Bridge is a proposed bridge which plans to connect the provinces of Bataan and Cavite.

History

Background and prior proposals
Then-Representative Felicito Payumo first proposed the construction of a bridge crossing Manila Bay in 1987, which he named as the Trans Manila Bay Crossing.

As chairman of the Subic Bay Metropolitan Authority (SBMA), Payumo attempted to realize the Trans Manila Bay Crossing as a bridge–tunnel system in the early 2000s. At least two Japanese firms, Itochu Corp. and NKK presented feasibility studies for the bridge–tunnel link to the SBMA but such plans were never realized.

In 2016, Payumo revived the proposal again, pitching the bridge as means to decongest traffic in Metro Manila and boost the economy. Comparing the proposed bridge to the Tokyo Bay Aqua-Line, Payumo has noted that commuters in Cavite and other parts of Southern Luzon do not need to pass through Metro Manila to reach Central Luzon if such bridge would be built.

China State Construction Engineering Corporation (CSCEC) began its onsite study as preparation for the possible construction of the bridge in late 2017. Its team first visited the coastal towns in Bataan.

Approval
The implementation of the bridge project is projected to last six years.

In October 2020, the Department of Public Works and Highways (DPWH) signed a $59 million engineering design contract, awarded to the joint venture of T. Y. Lin International from the US and Korea's Pyunghwa Engineering Consultants Ltd., who are working in tandem with Geneva-based Renardet S.A. and local firm DCCD Engineering Corporation.

As of March 2023, the project's detailed engineering design is already 70% complete, according to DPWH. The construction of the bridge is targeted to start in late 2023.

Specifications
The four-lane bridge will connect the towns of Mariveles, Bataan and Naic, Cavite. The bridge will consist of two main navigation bridges.

The starting point will be located in Barangay Alas-asin near the Mariveles Freeport Area, then 2 cable-stayed bridges called the North Channel Bridge (main span of 400 meters) and South Channel Bridge (main span of 900 meters) will be constructed, before terminating in Barangay Timalan Balsahan, Naic, Cavite, with the marine bridges standing in water as deep as 50 meters. The Detailed Design Engineering Phase of the project is expected to last 15 months.

The bridge will need to be high enough to allow large ships to pass under it since Manila Bay is a major shipping route accommodated by the Port of Manila.

References

Proposed bridges in the Philippines
Buildings and structures in Bataan
Buildings and structures in Cavite
Transportation in Bataan
Transportation in Cavite